Alex Bernard Holcombe (born November 22, 1969) is an American former professional basketball player. He played for Kashmere High School in Houston, Texas before playing college basketball for the Baylor Bears. Holcombe was selected by the Sacramento Kings as the 44th overall pick in the 1993 NBA draft but never played in the National Basketball Association (NBA). He instead played professionally in Europe, Puerto Rico, Argentina, Japan, Venezuela and the United States minor leagues.

His son, Alex Holcombe, plays college basketball for the Dallas Baptist Patriots.

Career statistics

College

|-
| style="text-align:left;"| 1989–90
| style="text-align:left;"| Baylor
| 24 || – || 13.2 || .566 || – || .548 || 3.6 || .6 || .4 || .5 || 4.9
|-
| style="text-align:left;"| 1990–91
| style="text-align:left;"| Baylor
| 26 || – || 14.5 || .578 || – || .391 || 3.5 || .3 || .3 || .4 || 4.7
|-
| style="text-align:left;"| 1991–92
| style="text-align:left;"| Baylor
| 27 || 26 || 19.2 || .600 || – || .583 || 4.6 || .4 || .4 || .9 || 7.6
|-
| style="text-align:left;"| 1992–93
| style="text-align:left;"| Baylor
| 27 || 27 || 35.1 || .624 || – || .578 || 9.4 || 1.1 || 1.0 || 1.9 || 19.2
|- class="sortbottom"
| style="text-align:center;" colspan="2"| Career
| 104 || 53 || 20.8 || .605 || – || .546 || 5.3 || .6 || .5 || .9 || 9.3

References

External links
 College statistics
 International statistics
 CBA stats
 Argentine league stats
 Polish league stats

1969 births
Living people
American expatriate basketball people in Argentina
American expatriate basketball people in Belgium
American expatriate basketball people in Japan
American expatriate basketball people in Mexico
American expatriate basketball people in Poland
American expatriate basketball people in Spain
American expatriate basketball people in Venezuela
American men's basketball players
Basketball players from Houston
Baylor Bears men's basketball players
CB Breogán players
Centers (basketball)
Grand Rapids Hoops players
Mexico Aztecas players
Nagoya Diamond Dolphins players
New Mexico Slam players
Olimpia de Venado Tuerto basketball players
Piratas de Quebradillas players
Power forwards (basketball)
Real Betis Baloncesto players
Sacramento Kings draft picks
Trotamundos B.B.C. players